Maurice Gleize (1898–1974) was a French screenwriter and film director.

Selected filmography

Director
 The Red Night (1923)
 Madonna of the Sleeping Cars (1928)
 A Hen on a Wall (1936)
 Coral Reefs (1939)
 Sowing the Wind (1944)

Screenwriter
 Thérèse Martin (1939)

References

Bibliography
 Hayward, Susan. French National Cinema. Routledge, 2006.

External links

1898 births
1974 deaths
French male screenwriters
20th-century French screenwriters
French film directors
20th-century French male writers